Bilal Hussein may refer to:
 Bilal Hussein (photojournalist)
 Bilal Hussein (footballer)

See also
 Bilal Hussain, Pakistani cricketer